National Social Integration Party (in Albanian: Partia Integrimi Social Kombetar) is a political party in Albania led by Petrit Memia.

References 

Political parties in Albania